Tamerdash (also Romanized as Tamerdāsh; also known as Tamīrdāsh and Tamīrtāsh) is a village in Ojarud-e Sharqi Rural District, Muran District, Germi County, Ardabil Province, Iran. At the 2006 census, its population was 40, in 9 families.

References 

Towns and villages in Germi County